Gnathoxys is a genus of beetles in the family Carabidae, containing the following species:

 Gnathoxys barbatus MacLeay, 1864
 Gnathoxys cicatricosus Reiche, 1842
 Gnathoxys crassipes Sloane, 1898
 Gnathoxys foveatus MacLeay, 1863
 Gnathoxys granularis Westwood, 1842
 Gnathoxys humeralis MacLeay, 1864
 Gnathoxys insignitus MacLeay, 1864
 Gnathoxys irregularis Westwood, 1842
 Gnathoxys macleayi Putzeys, 1868
 Gnathoxys murrumbidgensis MacLeay, 1865
 Gnathoxys obscurus Reiche, 1842
 Gnathoxys pannuceus Guthrie, 2007
 Gnathoxys punctipennis MacLeay, 1873
 Gnathoxys submetallicus MacLeay, 1864
 Gnathoxys sulcicollis Sloane, 1910
 Gnathoxys tesselatus MacLeay, 1864
 Gnathoxys westwoodi Putzeys, 1868

References

Broscini
Carabidae genera